Morocco competed at the 2013 World Aquatics Championships in Barcelona, Spain between 19 July and 4 August 2013.

Swimming

Moroccan swimmers earned qualifying standards in the following events (up to a maximum of 2 swimmers in each event at the A-standard entry time, and 1 at the B-standard):

Men

References

External links
Barcelona 2013 Official Site
FRMN web site

Nations at the 2013 World Aquatics Championships
2013
World Aquatics Championships